Santokben Bachubhai Aarethiya (born 1965) is a politician from Gujarat, India. She is a member of Indian National Congress. She was a member of 14th Gujarat Legislative Assembly from Rapar constituency.

References

Living people
People from Kutch district
Indian National Congress politicians from Gujarat
Women in Gujarat politics
Gujarat MLAs 2017–2022
21st-century Indian women politicians
21st-century Indian politicians
1965 births